Batrachedra tarsimaculata is a moth in the family Batrachedridae. It is found in the West Indies.

References

Natural History Museum Lepidoptera generic names catalog

Batrachedridae
Moths of the Caribbean
Moths described in 1897